Chandmama is a village of Barpeta District in the Indian state of Assam. It is located in the south west corner of the district, which has its headquarters in  Barpeta. There are 3 parts of the village are Chandmama Pather, Chandmama K and Chandmama Gaon.

History
According to Kalika Puran and Bongbhashi, the village was established 1205 as named chandmimi (an Assamese word which means "small moon"); later it was renamed as Chandmama by the East Bengal rooted Muslim.

Demography
The village carries mainly Muslim from Pabna and Mymensingh districts of British India but now they have fully converted to indigenous Assamese. The large village has 282747 population where 140747 are male and rest are females.

Notable People
Ala Baksha Sarkar (Freedom fighter)
Taimuddin Haji  (Freedom fighter)
Ayan Pramanik
Majitullah Sarkar
Rahim Baksha Dewani
Jahar Akand
Haji Mahiruddin
Bahaj Uddin Akand 
Alhaj Golam Mowla Baksha (Freedom fighter)
Sahab Uddin Ahmed
Haji Jahabaksha Bhuyan 
Haji Alabaksha(Freedom fighter)
Prof Hazrat Bakshi
Dr. Arifur Rahman

Education
There are 10+ Govt Lower primary schools and 10+ Upper primary schools running till date. []

References 

Barpeta district